Charles ("Charlie") Edward Carrigan (28 April 1882 – 28 April 1916) was an Irish republican.

Background

Carrigan was born in Denny, Stirlingshire Scotland, to Irish parents and was trained tailor to trade but also attended classes in history and literature and was proficient in French and Latin, studied Irish, and was a Gaelic Leaguer.

Political activity

Carrigan became President of his local branch of the United Irish League in Denny in 1898 and later became a member of the Irish Republican Brotherhood and in 1905 he became the Chairman of Sinn Féin's first ever Cumann in Scotland, the Éire Óg Craobh Cumann.

Easter Rising

Carrigan joined the Irish Volunteers in 1915 after the split from Redmonds National Volunteers. In January 1916, Carrigan and fellow IRB members from Glasgow travelled to Dublin along with members of Na Fianna and Cumann na mBan and formed the Scottish Division of the Irish Volunteers and were based at the home of Count Plunkett in Kimmage, County Dublin where they prepared for an insurrection against British rule in Ireland.

On Easter Monday, 24 April 1916, the overseas contingents including the Scottish Division and the North American-based Hibernian Rifles participated of the Easter Rising.

During an evacuation of the GPO Carrigan was shot and killed by British soldiers on Moore Street.

Carrigan was buried in St Paul's Cemetery, Glasnevin.

References 

1882 births
1916 deaths
Scottish people of Irish descent
Members of the Irish Republican Brotherhood
People from Dennistoun
People of the Easter Rising
Irish military personnel killed in action
19th-century Scottish people
Deaths by firearm in the Republic of Ireland